Leonardo Apuzzo (born 16 August 2000) is an Italian rower twice world champion at junior level at the World Rowing Junior Championships.

Achievements

References

External links
 

2000 births
Living people
Italian male rowers